Volume III Just Right is the third album by the English music collective Soul II Soul, released in 1992 through Ten and Virgin Records. Its first single was "Joy".

The album peaked at No. 3 on the UK Albums Chart and No. 88 on the Billboard 200. "Mood" was nominated for the Grammy Award for Best R&B Instrumental Performance.

Production
The album was produced by Jazzie B, who also rapped on three of the tracks. Jazzie used several male vocalists on the album, including Richie Stephens.

Gary Barnacle played flute on Just Right; Snake Davis played saxophone. Caron Wheeler sang on "Take Me Higher". "Move Me No Mountain" is a cover of the song made famous by Love Unlimited.

Critical reception

Entertainment Weekly wrote that "Jazzie has returned to the low-key feel of his first album with little deviation, except that he has turned to male singers, instead of his usual stable of divas, to revive his by-now-stale formula." Trouser Press lamented that the collective had "devolved from a groundbreaking, if creatively unreliable, soul collective to a not particularly exciting R&B act." The Gazette considered the album "background music at best," writing that "this is when groovy becomes generic."

Rolling Stone noted that "the Seventies-obsessed string arrangements on Just Right are piquant and precise." The Indianapolis Star stated that "Jazzie B. and his 'sound system' turn in a confident, entertaining and well-plotted blend of R&B, jazz, African and dance influences." The Calgary Herald praised the "rich vocals, big fat beats, choral interludes, soul grooves and African wind instrumentals." The Virginian-Pilot called the album "sluggish buppie pop with some vaguely hip elements grafted on," writing that it "offers little but a desperate pandering to the Quiet Storm."

Track listing

Charts

References

1992 albums
Soul II Soul albums
Virgin Records albums